Azuara is a municipality located in the province of Zaragoza, Aragon, Spain. According to the 2010 census the municipality has a population of 220 inhabitants. Its postal code is 50140

Cueva del Cabuchico is an ancient Iberian archaeological site near Azuara.

See also
Azuara impact structure
Jiloca Comarca
List of municipalities in Zaragoza

References

External links

Azuara site
 Ernstson & Claudin - Impact Structures

Municipalities in the Province of Zaragoza